The source of information for this list comes from :zh:Category:台灣男歌手, :zh:Category:台灣女歌手 and :zh:Category:台灣原住民歌手. Sources for names and ethnicity can be found in their respective article pages.

The following is a list of Taiwanese singers in alphabetical order.

Artists are listed by the name they are known in English followed by their stage name in Chinese. Their birth name is given in parentheses and bold text signifies their ethnic minority group and aboriginal name if available.

A

B

C

D

F

G

H

J

K

L

M

O

P

Q

S

T

V

W

X

Y

Z

See also

List of C-pop artists
List of Taiwanese people

 
Taiwanese